Peggy Su! is a 1998 film written by Anglo-Chinese playwright Kevin Wong, directed by Frances-Anne Solomon and starring Pamela Oei. His own experience and background being the son of Chinese immigrants working in the laundry business was used.<ref>World Film Locations: Liverpool By Jez Conolly, Caroline Whelan [https://books.google.com/books?id=qscwsriVMpoC&dq=%22Peggy+Su%21%22&pg=PA86 Page 86 Peggy Su! (1997) Location > Liverpool Town Hall, High Street, Chamber]</ref> It was directed by Trinidadian Frances-Anne Solomon who had previously worked on What My Mother Told Me in 1994 and Bideshi in 1996.Trinidad and Tobago Newsday Thursday, May 22, 2008 Film Company hosts workshop

About the film
This romantic comedy set in Liverpool in 1962. It is about the Chinese community there and 19-year-old Peggy who lives above a family laundry business with her brother and his wife. it centers on Peggy (Pamela Oei) her attempts to find a husband and also her coping with the changing times in the early 1960s.Caribbean Beat Issue 36 Frances Anne Solomon: Beating the System by Bruce Paddington

The film has the distinction of being the first feature film to receive National Lottery funding. It was joint funded with the BBC.Caribbean Beat Issue 36 Frances Anne Solomon: Beating the System by Bruce Paddington  It was distributed by BBC Worldwide.

Film festival and award

Festival
 Reel Word Film Festival Canada (2001) Cineplex http://mediafiles.cineplex.com/FamousMagazineArchive/MAR2001/Mar2001_lo.pdf
 Overseas Chinese Fim Festival Glasgow (2002) 

Award
 RTS Television Award & BAFTA winner for best Costume Design by Joey Attawia.francesannesolomon.net Press Kit, Page 2, Short synopsis http://francesannesolomon.net/wp-content/uploads/2015/03/PEGGY-SU-PRESS-KIT-2-reduced.pdf

Review
 The Independent Sunday 23 August 1998 
 Positif'' n° 448, Page 41 & 60, 1998

Cast

 Jonathan Arun as Brian
 Jacqui Chan as Ifec Mah
 Daphne Cheung as Jackie
 Alphonsia Emmanuel as Miss James
 Glen Goei as David
 Burt Kwouk as Dad
 Pamela Oei as Peggy
 Charles T.H. Ong as David's father
 Adrian Pang as Gilbert
 Vincenzo Pellegrino as Terry
 Stuart Richma as Vicar
 Sukie Smith as Rita
 Daniel York as Jack
 Barbara Yu Ling as David's mother

Crew (selective)
 Screenplay ... Kevin Wong
 Executive producer ... George Faber
 Associate producer ... Yvonne Isimeme Ibazebo
 Director of photography ... Shelley Hirst
 Casting ... Carl Proctor
 Production design ... Choi Ho Man
 Costume design ... Joey Attawia
 Makeup artist ... Natasha Chambers
 Makeup designer ... Sharon Martin
 First assistant director ... Julian Holmes
 Second assistant director ... Pauline Oni
 Third assistant director ... Mzee Coffey, Lab Ky Mo

Company credits

Production
 Production Companies ... Arts Council of England, BBC Films, 
 The Mersyside Film Production Fund

Other
 ADR Facility ... Goldcrest Post Production London 
 Post production sound services ... The Sound Design Company

References

External links
 

1998 films
British romantic comedy films
British Chinese films
1990s English-language films
1990s British films